Gweneth Butler (1 June 1915 – 15 November 2006) was a British figure skater. She competed in the ladies' singles event at the 1936 Winter Olympics.

References

External links
 

1915 births
2006 deaths
British female single skaters
Olympic figure skaters of Great Britain
Figure skaters at the 1936 Winter Olympics
Sportspeople from London